Escala may refer to:

Geography
 Escala, Hautes-Pyrénées, a commune in the Hautes-Pyrénées department in southwestern France
  a building in Washington, United States
 L'Escala, a municipality in the comarca of the Alt Empordà in Girona, Catalonia, Spain

People
 Erasmo Escala (1826–1884), Chilean soldier and commander-in-chief of the army
 Pato Escala Pierart, Chilean animator and film producer
 Jaume Perich Escala (1941–1995), Spanish writer, cartoonist and humorist, better known as El Perich

Music
Escala nordestina (Portuguese: "Northeastern scale") musical scales commonly used in the music of the Nordeste
 Escala (group), an electronic string quartet from London, England
 Escala (album), their 2009 self-titled debut album

Other uses
 Cadillac Escala, a concept car built by Cadillac in 2016
 Escala scharrerae, a species of cockroach found in Australia

 Escala i corda, a variant of the handball sport of Valencian pilota

See also
 Scala (disambiguation)
 Scale (disambiguation)